Biernaty refers to the following places in Poland:

 Biernaty, Masovian Voivodeship
 Biernaty, Warmian-Masurian Voivodeship